Lovell Adams-Gray is a Canadian actor. He is best known for the role of Dru Tejada in  Power Book II: Ghost, and his performance in the web series 21 Black Futures, for which he won the Canadian Screen Award for Best Lead Performance in a Web Program or Series at the 10th Canadian Screen Awards in 2022.

Originally from the Etobicoke district of Toronto, he has also had roles in the television series Lost & Found Music Studios, Slasher, Second Jen and Coroner, and is slated to play Jelly in Clement Virgo's forthcoming film adaptation of David Chariandy's novel Brother.

Filmography

Film

Television

References

External links

21st-century Canadian male actors
Black Canadian male actors
Canadian male film actors
Canadian male television actors
Canadian male web series actors
Male actors from Toronto
Living people
1992 births
Canadian Screen Award winners